Sergey Mikhaylovich Kravtsov (born 17 February 1960) is a retired Belarusian sailor. He competed in the mixed multihull (Tornado) event at the 1988, 1992 and 1996 Summer Olympics, for the Soviet Union, Unified Team and Belarus, finishing in seventh, ninth and fourteenth place, respectively.

References 

1960 births
Living people
Belarusian male sailors (sport)
Olympic sailors of Belarus
Olympic sailors of the Soviet Union
Soviet male sailors (sport)
Olympic sailors of the Unified Team
Sailors at the 1988 Summer Olympics – Tornado
Sailors at the 1992 Summer Olympics – Tornado
Sailors at the 1996 Summer Olympics – Tornado
Tornado class world champions
World champions in sailing for Belarus